Niccolò Orsini (died 18 October 1653) was a Roman Catholic prelate who served as Bishop of Ripatransone (1636–1653).

Biography
On 22 September 1636, Niccolò Orsini was appointed Bishop of Ripatransone by Pope Urban VIII. On 28 September 1636, he was consecrated bishop by Giovanni Battista Maria Pallotta, Cardinal-Priest of San Silvestro in Capite, with Celso Zani, Bishop Emeritus of Città della Pieve, and Giovanni Battista Scanaroli, Titular Bishop of Sidon, serving as co-consecrators.

He served as Bishop of Ripatransone until his death on 18 October 1653.

References 

17th-century Italian Roman Catholic bishops
Bishops appointed by Pope Urban VIII
1653 deaths